Hard Times 3 (also known as Hard Times in New Orleans) was a professional wrestling pay-per-view (PPV) event promoted by the National Wrestling Alliance (NWA). It took place on November 12, 2022 at the Frederick J. Sigur Civic Center in Chalmette, Louisiana. It was the third event in the Hard Times chronology.

Sixteen matches were contested at the event, including four on the pre-show. In the main event, Tyrus defeated Matt Cardona and Trevor Murdoch to win the NWA Worlds Heavyweight Championship. In other prominent matches, Kamille defeated Chelsea Green and KiLynn King to retain the NWA World Women's Championship, La Rebelión (Bestia 666 and Mecha Wolf) defeated Hawx Aerie (Luke Hawx and PJ Hawx) to retain the NWA World Tag Team Championship, and Kerry Morton defeated Homicide to win the NWA World Junior Heavyweight Championship.

Production

Background
On August 27, 2022, during the 74th Anniversary Show, it was announced that Hard Times would take place on November 12 at the Frederick J. Sigur Civic Center in Chalmette, Louisiana.

Storylines
The event featured professional wrestling matches that involved different wrestlers from pre-existing scripted feuds and storylines. Wrestlers portrayed heroes, villains, or less distinguishable characters in scripted events that built tension and culminated in a wrestling match or series of matches. The tenth season of the NWA's weekly flagship program, Power, as well as the fourth season of their secondary program, NWA USA, featured storylines leading up to the event.

At Alwayz Ready, then-reigning NWA Worlds Heavyweight Champion Matt Cardona was forced to vacate the title due to a torn bicep. Trevor Murdoch - who Cardona defeated to win the title - would regain it in a four-way match against Nick Aldis, Thom Latimer, and Sam Shaw in the main event. On the August 30 episode of Powerrr, Cardona announced that he would challenge Murdoch for the title at Hard Times, with the match being made official on September 20. However, on the September 24 episode of NWA USA, NWA World Television Champion Tyrus, who unsuccessfully challenged Murdoch for the world title on Night two of the NWA 74th Anniversary Show, announced he would invoke his "Lucky Seven" opportunity, vacating the television title for a world title match. He would be added to Murdoch and Cardona's bout at Hard Times 3, making it a three-way match.

On Night One of the NWA 74, Kamille successfully defended the NWA World Women's Championship against Taya Valkyrie. On the September 6 edition of Powerrr, Valkyrie defeated Chelsea Green, Jennacide, and KiLynn King to become number one contender, while Kamille went to a time limit draw with Allysin Kay in a title match; setting up a rematch between the two for Hard Times 3. However, Bully Ray argued that King, his former trainee, deserved the title shot, so a match between Valkyrie and King was set for the October 11 Powerrr. There, King defeated Valkyrie for the right to challenge Kamille at Hard Times 3, a rematch of their first encounter at Alwayz Ready. On the October 18 Powerrr, Green defeated Angelina Love to win Velvet Sky's "Champions Series" title opportunity, which Green used to enter the title match at the event.

On the August 30 Powerrr, NWA legend Ricky Steamboat announced a tournament to crown a number one contender to Cyon's NWA National Championship. Qualifying matches would begin later that week on the September 3 and subsequent episodes of NWA USA. On the September 19 Powerrr, the semifinals began, with Dak Draper and Chris Adonis advancing to the finals after defeating Brian Myers and "Magic" Jake Dumas, respectively. On the subsequent episode of NWA USA, "Thrillbilly" Silas Mason defeated Judais to advance. On the October 11 Powerrr, Draper defeated Adonis and Mason to earn the title match against Cyon at Hard Times 3.

At NWA 74, Homicide defended the NWA World Junior Heavyweight Championship against both Kerry and Ricky Morton on consecutive nights. A few weeks later on the September 24 NWA USA, Kerry won a six-way scramble to earn another title match against Homicide at Hard Times 3.

On Night 1 of NWA 74, EC3 made his debut, defeating Matthew Mims. After the match, EC3 cut a promo saying that the NWA is a place of nostalgia, which he believes is nothing but a "crutch," and will ensure that nostalgia in professional wrestling is dead as long as he competes. Thom Latimer would confront EC3 in the ring to defend the NWA, setting up a match between the two for the following night. That match ended in a no contest when members of EC3's Control Your Narrative (CYN) promotion attacked Latimer. In the weeks leading to Hard Times, EC3 would continue to lambast the NWA for their reliance on nostalgia, while also questioning Latimer's purpose in the promotion. It came to a head on the October 4 episode of Powerrr, where Latimer confronted EC3 and challenged him to a match for later that show however EC3 counter proposed to have the match at the Hard Times 3, which Latimer accepted.

On the October 15th episode of NWA USA, NWA World Women's Tag Team Champions Pretty Empowered (Kenzie Paige and Ella Envy) were defeated in a non-title tag team match by a team that consisted of Madi Wrenkowski and Missa Kate. Three days later on the October 18 Powerrr, during the show's control center segment hosted by Kyle Davis, he announced that NWA President Billy Corgan was impressed by Wrenkowski and Kate enough that he gave that team a title match at Hard Times 3.

On October 20, the NWA announced that New Orleans natives Hawx Aerie (Luke Hawx and PJ Hawx) would be in tag team action at Hard Times 3, however no opponents had been announced. On the November 1 episode of Powerrr, Hawx Aerie defeated The Dirty Sexy Boys (Dirty Dango and JTG) to become number one contenders to the NWA World Tag Team Championship, and will face champions La Rebelión (Bestia 666 and Mecha Wolf) at Hard Times 3.

On the Powerrr after NWA 74, Aron Stevens announced the return of The Question Mark, which was really his client Rodney Mack under the Question Mark mask. However, two weeks later, after "The Question Mark" and KC Roxx - Stevens' other client - lost a tag team match, a new Question Mark emerged and attacked Stevens. They would later reveal themselves as The Question Mark II, the brother of the original Question Mark, Joseph Hudson. On the October 25 episode of PowerrrSurge, Kyle Davis announced a Mask vs. Mask match between both Question Marks for Hard Times, with the loser being forced to unmask.

After Tyrus had invoked the "Lucky Seven" to enter the world title match, the NWA World Television Championship was held as vacant. Two five-way elimination matches took place on the October 1 edition of NWA USA to determine the two wrestlers who would face off for the title at a later date. AJ Cazana and Jordan Clearwater would win their respective matches. The title match would then take place on the October 22 episode of NWA USA, but after many shenanigans, the match ended in a time limit draw. As a result, a rematch would take place at Hard Times, as announced on the October 25 PowerrrSurge with the time limit changed from 10 minutes to 15 minutes for this match only.

Cancelled match
On Night 2 of NWA 74, Nick Aldis defeated Flip Gordon before the pair were attacked by Odinson, leading to Aldis suffering a concussion. Nine days later on the September 6 episode of Powerrr, Odinson again attacked Gordon after the latter defeated Doug Williams. However, Aldis, who was ringside for the match, would prevent Odinson from doing any more damage. On the October 4 Powerrr, Odinson defeated Gordon before the former was again run off by Aldis. On October 10, the NWA announced that Aldis and Odinson will face off one-on-one at Hard Times 3. However, on November 6, Aldis announced his free agency in 2023, which caused the NWA to legitimately suspend Aldis, who would now not be present for the event. The NWA did not announce a new opponent for Odinson before the event, but Odinson still arrived at the event to see if he would get a substitute opponent.

Reception
The event was criticized due to Tyrus winning the NWA World Championship. Dave Scherer from PWInsider said that the event was "pretty bad". Chris Vetter from Pro Wrestling Dot Net complained about the amount of matches.

Results

NWA National Championship Number One Contender's Tournament

References

External links

2022 in professional wrestling
2022 in Louisiana
National Wrestling Alliance pay-per-view events
November 2022 events in the United States
NWA Hard Times
Professional wrestling in Louisiana